The Cary Invasion is a member of the Tobacco Road Basketball League and the Premiere Basketball League based in Cary, North Carolina which began play in 2011 as a member of the Continental Basketball League.  Home games are played at the Herbert Young Community Center in Downtown Cary.

2011 - 2012
After winning the CBL championship in their inaugural year, the team announced (with the Wilmington Sea Dawgs) the formation of the Tobacco Road Basketball League and their membership therein.

The team finished second in the TRBL, but lost in the championship game to the PrimeTime Players after besting the Wilmington Sea Dawgs in the semi-final.  Head coach Marqus Johnson stepped down for a college coaching position and was replaced by Chris La Rocca who lasted a short time and was then replaced by current head coach Erasto Hatchett.

Season-By-Season records

References

External links
Cary Invasion official website

Basketball teams in North Carolina
Cary, North Carolina
Former Continental Basketball League teams
Sports in Raleigh-Durham
Basketball teams established in 2011
2011 establishments in North Carolina